Ádám Nádasdy (born 15 February 1947) is a Hungarian linguist and poet. He is professor emeritus at the School of English and American Studies of the Faculty of Humanities of the Eötvös Loránd University, Budapest. He specializes in post-generative phonological theory, morphophonology, English and Germanic historical linguistics, varieties and dialects of English, as well as English medieval studies and Yiddish philology.

He holds the degrees of Master of Arts in English and Italian (1970, ELTE); Dr. univ. in English Linguistics (1977, ELTE); and PhD in Linguistics (1994, Hungarian Academy of Sciences, MTA). He speaks Hungarian (native), English, German, Italian and French. He wrote a regular column in the magazine Magyar Narancs, popularizing linguistics.

Nádasdy has translated plays by Shakespeare into Hungarian (often seen as ground-breaking after the "classic" translations of János Arany and others), namely The Comedy of Errors, A Midsummer Night's Dream, Taming of the Shrew, Hamlet, Romeo and Juliet, Twelfth Night, As You Like It, and The Tempest. His new Hungarian translation of the Divine Comedy by Dante was published in 2016.

He gave a lecture on Mindentudás Egyeteme (University of All Knowledge), a popular science TV series featuring renowned academics, in November 2003 on the topic "Why does language change?".

References

External links
 Profile at the School of English and American Studies, Eötvös Loránd University
 Short CV 
 Hungarian – A Strange Cake on the Menu – an article by Nádasdy

Linguists from Hungary
20th-century Hungarian poets
Hungarian male poets
Living people
Hungarian translators
Hungarian gay writers
Hungarian LGBT poets
Gay poets
1947 births
20th-century Hungarian male writers
21st-century Hungarian poets
21st-century Hungarian male writers